Donax hanleyanus, common name the wedge clam (in Argentina and Uruguay known as: berberecho; in Brazil (at least in Rio de Janeiro state) known as: sarnambi), is a marine bivalve mollusk species in the family Donacidae, the bean clams or wedge shells. It is widely distributed throughout the sandy beaches of the Atlantic coast of South America, from Brazil to Argentina.

References

Donacidae
Bivalves described in 1847
Taxa named by Rodolfo Amando Philippi